Augusto Rodríguez may refer to:

Augusto Rodríguez (soldier) (1835–1880), Puerto Rican soldier who fought in the American Civil War
Augusto Rodríguez (musician) (1904–1993), Puerto Rican musician who founded the "Coro de la Universidad de Puerto Rico" (The Choir of the University of Puerto Rico)